The Adams Express Building is an office building at 61 Broadway in the Financial District of Manhattan, New York City. The building's primary frontage is on 57-61 Broadway, with additional frontage along 33–41 Trinity Place. Architect Francis Kimball designed the 32–story building for the Adams Express Company. 

Construction began in 1912 at which point the cost was estimated at $2,000,000. Upon completion in 1914, the building was the seventh tallest structure in Manhattan.  it is owned by RXR Realty.

Architecture
The building contains 3,300 tons of steel and over a million square feet of architectural terracotta. The New York Times described the architectural style as "Florentine" below the fifth floor, and "severely simple" above. Another critic called the style "utterly utilitarian," but the New York City Landmarks Preservation Commission identified the architecture as palazzo.

An entrance was constructed to the New York City Subway's Wall Street station, underneath Broadway, but was later closed.

History

Background

The Adams Express Company occupied part of the Pinkerton Building at 57-59 Broadway. In 1903, there was discussion of combining 57-61 Broadway with an adjacent property occupied by American Express and Wells Fargo, and building one large building for the three companies. This did not happen, and American Express's adjacent building at 65 Broadway was completed in 1917.

A 1904 fire that began in the basement of the Morris Building at 63 Broadway, damaged the Pinkerton and other buildings on the block. Twenty-four engines and six hook and ladder companies responded. The Fire Department of New York recorded that the Adams Express Company building was destroyed, but Adams Express continued to occupy the site. By 1906, Adams Express was planning a new, fireproof building to be constructed on the site of the Pinkerton Building.

Construction
In 1910 Industrial World Magazine reported that Adams Express was proceeding with a 10-story, brick and limestone building designed by George K. Hooper of Hooper-Faulkenau Engineering Company. Then in 1911, Adams Express finally purchased the Pinkerton Building. Although Hooper's plans would have blended with existing buildings in the Financial District where, in 1912, nearly half of the buildings were five stories or lower, the Hooper design was never constructed, as it was apparently too small. Instead, in 1912, Francis Kimball was hired to build a 32-story structure.

When construction began in 1912 on the Kimball design, first The New York Times and later city planners became concerned about sunlight and airspace. The Adams Express Building was one of a growing number of behemoths, most notably the then-under-construction Equitable Building, that cast shadows not only on the street but on nearby smaller buildings and drove down real estate value, rent, and tax revenues. F.W. Fitzpatrick complained that the Adams Express Building cast an 875-foot shadow. The 1916 Zoning Resolution provided a remedy in the form of setbacks where new buildings would be stepped back at certain heights depending on the width at the street. The restrictions would have applied to 75% of the ground area of the building, but construction of the Adams Express Building had occurred before the new zoning restrictions were adopted.

Later history
The building sustained heavy damage in 1916 when 300 windows were blown out in the Black Tom explosion.

When the building was purchased by Metropolitan Life Insurance Company in 1988, an engineer discovered goldfish living in a pool of water below the basement heating system.  Since that time, building engineers have fed the fish as a part of their regular maintenance routine.

References

External links 

 
 The Pinkerton Building at 57 Broadway
 History of the Express Business

Broadway (Manhattan)
Consolidated National Bank
Financial District, Manhattan
New York City Designated Landmarks in Manhattan
Office buildings completed in 1914
Skyscraper office buildings in Manhattan